The Monument to the People's Heroes 上海市人民英雄纪念塔 is a concrete structure in Shanghai, China. The structure is located at the north end of the Bund, at the confluence of the Suzhou Creek and the Huangpu River, within the grounds of the Huangpu Park.

The structure was built by the Shanghai municipal government in 1993 to commemorate revolutionary martyrs, as well as those who have died fighting natural disasters.

See also
 Monument to the People's Heroes in Beijing
 Civilian War Memorial: a monument in Singapore with architectural similarities

External links
 

1990s establishments in China
Buildings and structures in Shanghai
Monuments and memorials in China
The Bund